Gwanghwamun is the main and largest gate of Gyeongbok Palace, in Jongno-gu, Seoul, South Korea. It is located at a three-way intersection at the northern end of Sejongno. As a landmark and symbol of Seoul's long history as the capital city during the Joseon Dynasty, the gate has gone through multiple periods of destruction and disrepair.  The most recent large-scale restoration work on the gate was finished and it was opened to the public on August 15, 2010.

History
Gwanghwamun was first constructed in 1395 as the main gate to Gyeongbok Palace, the main and most important royal palace during the Joseon Dynasty. During the 1592 Japanese invasion, it was destroyed by fire and left in ruins for over 250 years.

Gwanghwamun was reconstructed in 1867 along with the rest of Gyeongbokgung Palace by the order of regent Daewongun during the reign of Emperor Gojong.  The gate stood until 1926, when the Japanese government had it deconstructed and moved it just to the southeast of the current location of the National Folk Museum of Korea to make way for the massive Japanese Governor General Building. 

The Korean War completely destroyed the wooden structure of Gwanghwamun, and its stone base lay in complete disrepair and neglect. In 1968, during Park Chung-hee's administration, the stone base was again relocated in front of the Japanese Governor General Building.  The destroyed wooden structure was rebuilt in concrete, while the sign on Gwanghwamun was written in hangul by Park himself.  Gwanghwamun remained as a concrete gate until late 2006.

Restoration

Gwanghwamun underwent a major restoration project since December 2006 and was finished in August 2010. The gate was disassembled and moved back to its original location 14.5 meters to the south, and its wooden structure was again reconstructed in wood.  It was rotated in order to accurately place the gate to its original location, which perfectly aligns it with the main north-south axis of Gyeongbokgung Palace.  The restoration was commenced by the South Korean government because an earlier restoration employed concrete instead of traditional materials and wrongly aligned the gate to the entrance of the Governor General Building, now destroyed.

The aim of the latest renovation was to restore Gwanghwamun to its original wooden construction while paying meticulous attention to historical accuracy.  The name plate of Gwanghwamun was recreated by analyzing its century-old glass plate photographs, while its wooden structure was devised from a blueprint created in 1925 by the Japanese Colonial Government.  Pine wood used in the construction was painstakingly selected in Korea as the use of foreign imported wood for recreating Korea's historic buildings was strictly forbidden.

Gwanghwamun was opened to the public on August 15, 2010, to commemorate Gwangbokjeol, or Liberation Day of Korea. The project cost .  A new name plate on the restored Gwanghwamun was unveiled on the same day. The name on the plate was based on Hanja lettering by Im Tae-young, the general in charge of the rebuilding programme by King Gojong of Joseon, written against a white backdrop framed by Dancheong traditional coloring painted by master Yang Yong-ho. The lettering was done by master Oh Ok-jin, using the gakjajang method of calligraphic engraving, a technique designated as Important Intangible Cultural Property no 106.

However, cracks in the wooden plate were showing by early November, where a long vertical crack is visible on the left side of Hanja character "光" and beneath "門" in the middle. The Cultural Heritage Administration (CHA) blamed the dry autumn weather for the contraction of the wood, but experts differs on that an immature pine board was used to meet the deadline for completion and that the wood had not dried properly.  After many debates, a repair to the cracks was made, and the panel at CHA concluded in December 2010 that it should be replaced, hence the Government commissioned a new name plate. 13 wooden boards for the new signboard were cut in September 2011 and have since undergone a natural drying process in Gangwon Province. However, in a survey of 5,000 people conducted by the Cultural Heritage Administration, 58.7 percent responded that the inscription should be in Hangul while 41.3 percent opted Hanja. The long-lost 1395 original was written in Hanja. A majority of experts consulted thought the sign should be carved as the original had been.

Tourism

The area in front of Gwanghwamun, known as the Gwanghwamun Plaza, was opened as a public open space on 1 August 2009. It is part of the Seoul Metropolitan Government's plans for environmentally friendly renovation projects such as the Cheonggye Stream and Seoul Plaza.

In a poll of nearly 2,000 foreign visitors conducted by the Seoul Metropolitan Government in November 2011, visitors stated that watching the changing of the guards at the main gate as their third favorite activity in Seoul. The royal changing of the guard ceremony is held in front of the main gate every hour from 10:00 to 15:00.

On 23 September 2012, the Seoul Metropolitan Government started on a trial basis, a 550-m designated section of Sejong-ro as pedestrian-only but permitted for cyclists. The section includes the road from the Gwanghwamun three-way intersection, along Gwanghwamun Plaza in front of the Sejong Center for the Performing Arts to the Sejong-ro intersection.

Transport
 Gyeongbokgung Station on Seoul Subway Line 3 - nearest to the Gate
 Gwanghwamun Station on Seoul Subway Line 5 - located 600 metres at the southern end of Gwanghwamun Plaza
 City Hall Station on Seoul Subway Line 1 and Seoul Subway Line 2 - located 800 meters at the southern end of Gwanghwamun Plaza

See also
Gwanghwamun Plaza
Statue of King Sejong
Jeong Do-jeon
Gyeongbokgung
Cheonggyecheon

References

External links

Gwanghwamun at Korea Tourism Organization website
Gwanghwamun street

Jongno District
Buildings and structures in Seoul
History of Seoul
1395 establishments in Asia
Gates in South Korea
Gates in Korea
Tourist attractions in Seoul
14th-century establishments in Korea